Salem Mabrouki Stadium is a multi-purpose stadium in Rouïba, Algiers, Algeria. It is currently used mostly for football matches. The stadium has a capacity of 12,000 people.

References

Salem Mabrouki Stadium
Buildings and structures in Algiers Province
Multi-purpose stadiums in Algeria
Sport in Algiers